Christophe Tinseau (born 18 December 1969) is a French racing driver from Orléans.

Tinseau began racing professionally in French Formula Renault in 1991. In 1992 he moved to French Formula Three and in 1993 he placed 4th in that championship with 2 wins and finished 10th in the Macau Grand Prix. In 1994 he was the championship runner-up in French F3 and in 1995 he moved up to Formula 3000 where he finished 16th with 7 race starts. In 1996 he improved to 6th in F3000, winning the season-ending race at Hockenheim. In 1997 he raced in Indy Lights but only managed an 11th place championship finish, ending up on the podium once at Circuit Trois-Rivières. After the seeming decline in his open-wheel fortunes, Tinseau moved to sports cars for 1998 driving a Panoz Esperante GTR-1 for DAMS, making his 24 Hours of Le Mans debut. In 1999, still with DAMS he piloted a Judd powered Lola B98/10 for and won two races in the Sports Racing World Cup. From 2000 to 2002 he drove the historic Cadillac Northstar LMP at Le Mans, finishing 5th in class in 2001. He competed part-time in various series from 2003 to 2005, but returned to full-time racing in 2006 when he finished 6th in Porsche Carrera Cup France. He made 6 Le Mans Series starts and finished 6th at Le Mans for Pescarolo Sport in 2007. He continued with the team in 2008 and finished 7th at Le Mans and 8th in LMS points and continued with the team in 2009, finishing second in Le Mans Series. In 2010 he competed in the NASCAR Whelen Euro Series, finishing eighth with one win. In 2011 he returned to Le Mans Series with Pescarolo and finished fourth in the championship. In 2012 he competed in a handful of major endurance races, and since then has been largely retired. He has founded a racing school for ice racing.

Racing record

Complete International Formula 3000 results
(key) (Races in bold indicate pole position; races in italics indicate fastest lap.)

Complete FIA GT Championship results
(key) (Races in bold indicate pole position) (Races in italics indicate fastest lap)

24 Hours of Le Mans results

References

External links
Christophe Tinseau at Driver Database
Official Website

1969 births
French racing drivers
French Formula Renault 2.0 drivers
French Formula Three Championship drivers
International Formula 3000 drivers
Indy Lights drivers
24 Hours of Le Mans drivers
American Le Mans Series drivers
FIA GT Championship drivers
Sportspeople from Orléans
Living people
European Le Mans Series drivers
24 Hours of Spa drivers
Asian Le Mans Series drivers

DAMS drivers
OAK Racing drivers
TDS Racing drivers
Pescarolo Sport drivers
Conquest Racing drivers
David Price Racing drivers
24H Series drivers